The Sprecher 150 is a  annual ARCA Menards Series/ARCA Menards Series East combination race held at the Milwaukee Mile in West Allis, Wisconsin. The event returned to the ARCA schedule in 2021 for the first time since 2007. It was originally held from 1982 and 1983 before being brought back from 2005 through 2007. The ARCA Menards Series East, formerly the NASCAR K&N Pro Series East, joined the ARCA Menards Series in this race starting in 2021 and it became one of three combination races for the two series, the others being Iowa and Bristol.

History

ARCA first raced at the Milwaukee Mile in 1958 with races co-sanctioned with USAC.

ARCA brought the Milwaukee Mile back to its schedule on June 4, 2005. It was the eighth event that ARCA either sanctioned or co-sanctioned at the track. David Ragan qualified on the pole position. Frank Kimmel led 89 of 150 laps to take the win. Joey Miller finished second, Chad Blount finished third, Erik Darnell fourth, and Bobby Gerhart ended up finishing fifth.

Phil Bozell won the 2006 Governor's Cup 200 in his fourth start of the season. It was his first and only ARCA victory. The Michigan driver qualified second quickest and Blake Bjorklund sat on the pole position. Tim Schendel finished second, Frank Kimmel third, Justin Allgaier fourth, and Ryan Mathews fifth.

Frank Kimmel won the 2007 Governor's Cup 200 on a Sunday afternoon race. The clutch in his car failed early in the race and his team had to push the car to get it moving after each pit stop. This caused him to start deep in the field after each stop. It was Kimmel's 71st ARCA victory. Rookie Justin Marks had his then-best second place finished after leading 59 laps. Michael McDowell led 43 laps and finished fourth after a pit stop with 13 laps remaining. 2006 race winner Phil Bozell led 28 laps and he was battling Marks for the lead late in the race but ran out of fuel with 10 laps remaining. Rookie James Buescher led 30 laps before an accident took him out on lap 134 and Ken Butler III led 24 laps before his rear end failed. The race featured eight leaders and ten lead changes. It had nine caution periods for 45 laps.

Past winners

1982: Race shortened to 171 laps due to rain.

References

External links
 

1982 establishments in Wisconsin
2005 establishments in Wisconsin
2021 establishments in Wisconsin
NASCAR races at the Milwaukee Mile
ARCA Menards Series races
ARCA Menards Series
ARCA Menards Series East
Motorsport in Wisconsin
Recurring sporting events established in 2021
Annual sporting events in the United States
August sporting events